"I Know" is a song by South Korean boy group Seo Taiji and Boys from their self-titled debut studio album, released on March 23, 1992. It was written and produced entirely by group leader and musician Seo Taiji. Incorporating a mix of Western influences such as hip-hop, new jack swing, and guitars, the song became a pivotal moment in Korean music history and is widely regarded as the pioneering work for the beginning of the modern K-pop market. It was a major commercial hit domestically, breaking the record for the longest charting song at number-one for 17 consecutive weeks.

Promotion
On April 11, 1992, the trio debuted on MBC's talent show with their song "I Know", and got the lowest rating from the jury; however, the song and album of the same name became so successful that it paved the way for other songs of the same format. The birth of modern K-pop has been since largely attributed to their first televised performance on the talent show from that day. The song's success was attributed to its new jack swing-inspired beats and memorable chorus, as well as innovative lyrics which dealt with the problems of Korean society. Their footsteps were followed by a wave of successful hip hop and R&B artists like Yoo Seung-jun, Jinusean, Solid, Deux, 1TYM and Drunken Tiger.

Seo and bandmates' outfits for the promotional cycle of "I Know" included vibrant streetwear such as oversized T-shirts and sweatshirts, windbreakers, overalls worn with one strap, overalls worn with one pant leg rolled up, and American sports team jerseys. Accessories included baseball caps worn backwards, bucket hats, and do-rags. Influenced by the videos for Technotronic's "Pump Up the Jam" (1989) and Snap!'s "The Power" (1990), the music video for "Nan Arayo" was directed by Ko Jae-hyung and features varying color saturation and chroma key editing, varying the angles of the dancers' bodies constantly. In an internet survey conducted by MTV Korea in 2004, the video was ranked number 43 in their list of "Best 100 Korean Music Videos".

Reception and accolades
"I Know" ranked number three on the year-end popular songs ranking for 1992, placing behind Shin Seung-hun's "Invisible Love" and 015B's "Old Lovers". Seo Taiji and Boys won several awards with the song, including the Grand Prize daesang at the 3rd Seoul Music Awards. "I Know" received 26 wins on South Korean music programs in 1992, the second-most out of any K-pop song for nearly three decades, behind only "Invisible Love" with 31 wins set earlier that year. "Dynamite" (2020) by BTS would later set a new record with 32 wins in 2021.

Impact and legacy
"Nan Arayo" is recognized for establishing the popularity of rap in K-pop and hybridizing the Korean ballad style with rap, rock, and techno. One of the first Korean rap songs, its new jack swing-inspired beats, upbeat rap verses and pop-style choruses combined with a focus on new dance moves took Korean audiences by storm. NPR wrote that "For many South Korean youths, the track was their first exposure to hip-hop and New Jack Swing and a welcome alternative to traditional styles of music". Vox said that "'I Know' represented the first time modern American-style pop music had been fused with South Korean culture." Regarding its release, MTV Iggy wrote that "K-pop music would never be the same" again.  

In a 2008 survey involving 100 music experts in the South Korean entertainment industry, "I Know" ranked number one in their list of 25 best Korean songs in history. Spin magazine named "I Know" number four on their 2012 list of the 21 Greatest K-Pop Songs of All Time. Mnet chose "I Know" as the number one song on their 2014 countdown Legend 100 Songs, a list of the most influential songs in Korean popular music since the 1960s. In 2020, Rolling Stone named the same song number 43 on its list of the 75 Greatest Boy Band Songs of All Time, saying that they steered the "Korean pop scene that we know today", establishing the scene's affection for boy bands and girl groups as opposed to solo acts. In 2021, online portal Melon and newspaper Seoul Shinmun ranked it as the 21st best K-pop song of all time, with music critic Minjae Jeong writing that "After 'I Know', everything changed. ... Today, it is safe to say that our K-pop-oriented music market actually originated from them."

References

1992 songs
1992 singles
Hip hop songs
Seo Taiji and Boys songs